In Greek mythology, Astrabacus (Ancient Greek:  Ἀστραβάκου) is a Spartan, the son of Irbus (son of Amphisthenes, son of Amphicles, son of Agis I). He and his brother Alopecus found a wooden image of the goddess Artemis Orthia under a bush of willows; it was surrounded in such a way that it stood upright. Astrabacus had a hero-shrine in Sparta

Note

References 

 Pausanias, Description of Greece with an English Translation by W.H.S. Jones, Litt.D., and H.A. Ormerod, M.A., in 4 Volumes. Cambridge, MA, Harvard University Press; London, William Heinemann Ltd. 1918. . Online version at the Perseus Digital Library
 Pausanias, Graeciae Descriptio. 3 vols. Leipzig, Teubner. 1903.  Greek text available at the Perseus Digital Library.

Characters in Greek mythology